is an uninhabited set of rocky islands off the coast of the Shimokita Peninsula in Mutsu Bay. The island is a part of the city of Mutsu in Aomori Prefecture. It is a part of the prefecture-managed, Shimokita Hantō Quasi-National Park.

Geography
Administratively, the islands are part of the former village of Wakinosawa that is now part of the city of Mutsu. During the village's existence, the island was often used a symbol of the municipality. The name Taijima is derived from the islands' appearance of a Red seabream swimming along the surface of the water. The islands are referred to as the body and tail of the fish. The  body island is covered with green, but the tail is stained white from the droppings of seabirds on its steep rocky surface. The waters surrounding Taijima are designated as a protected marine park. In addition to this marine park, the islands are included in the larger prefecture-managed, Shimokita Hantō Quasi-National Park.

Human history
Though the island is uninhabited, a shrine to Benzaiten has existed on the island since the Heian period. A legend holds that a lover of the Heian period shōgun Sakanoue no Tamuramaro was left behind on the island after the conclusion of his campaign to conquer the Emishi. After slipping slowly into madness, she perished on the island, where she was buried by the local people. A lighthouse was built on the body island, entering service on 22 January 1945.

The island gained protection after the creation of Shimokita Hantō Quasi-National Park on 22 July 1968. In 1979 the central section of the island collapsed into the sea, dividing the island into the two smaller islands that are extant. In 1997 work was conducted by the prefectural government of Aomori to prevent further deterioration of the islands.

See also

References

External links

Islands of Aomori Prefecture
Mutsu, Aomori